The 1879 Chicago White Stockings season was the 8th season of the Chicago White Stockings franchise, the 4th in the National League and the 2nd at Lakefront Park. The White Stockings finished fourth in the National League with a record of 46–33.

Regular season

Season standings

Record vs. opponents

Roster

Player stats

Batting

Starters by position
Note: Pos = Position; G = Games played; AB = At bats; H = Hits; Avg. = Batting average; HR = Home runs; RBI = Runs batted in

Other batters
Note: G = Games played; AB = At bats; H = Hits; Avg. = Batting average; HR = Home runs; RBI = Runs batted in

Pitching

Starting pitchers
Note: G = Games pitched; IP = Innings pitched; W = Wins; L = Losses; ERA = Earned run average; SO = Strikeouts

References
1879 Chicago White Stockings season at Baseball Reference

Chicago Cubs seasons
Chicago White Stockings season
Chicago Cubs